Aleksandr Valeryevich Stepin (born 7 February 1972) is a former Russian professional football player.

Club career
He made his professional debut in the Soviet Second League in 1990 for FC Dynamo Bryansk. He played 6 games in the UEFA Intertoto Cup 1998 for FC Baltika Kaliningrad.

References

1972 births
Sportspeople from Bryansk
Living people
Soviet footballers
Russian footballers
Association football midfielders
Russian Premier League players
FC Fakel Voronezh players
FC Baltika Kaliningrad players
FC Salyut Belgorod players
FC Volgar Astrakhan players
FC Yenisey Krasnoyarsk players
FC Dynamo Bryansk players